Nikolai Alexandrovich Morozov (born 17 December 1975) is a Russian former competitive ice dancer, figure skating coach and choreographer. He represented Russia, Belarus and Azerbaijan in competition. He coached Shizuka Arakawa to the 2006 Olympic gold medal and Miki Ando to two World titles. He is a former competitive ice dancer who appeared with Tatiana Navka for Belarus at the 1998 Winter Olympics, placing 16th, and at the 1998 World Championships, placing 10th. Earlier in his career, he competed with Olga Pershankova for Azerbaijan and with Ekaterina Gvozdkova for Russia.

Personal life 
Morozov was born in Moscow, Russian SFSR, Soviet Union. He was formerly married to French ice dancer Caroline Douarin, with whom he has a daughter, Annabelle Nicole, born in 2001. He was married to Canadian ice dancer Shae-Lynn Bourne from August 2005 to July 2007. He briefly dated his former pupil Miki Ando while he was coaching her. In May 2016, Morozov married another student of his, Vasilisa Davankova. In July 2019 during an interview Davankova revealed that she and Morozov were divorced.

Competitive career

Early career 
Morozov's parents introduced him to skating when he was five after doctors advised them that he needed more exercise. He was a singles skater until the age of 16 when he took up ice dancing. He spent one year working with coach Natalia Linichuk in Switzerland and was paired with Olga Pershankova. Representing Azerbaijan, they placed 21st at the 1994 World Championships.

In the 1994–95 season, Morozov began competing with Ekaterina Gvozdkova for Russia. They won the bronze medal at the 1995 Lysiane Lauret Challenge.

Partnership with Navka 
Morozov teamed up with Tatiana Navka in 1996. They represented Belarus. At their first practice at the 1997 World Championships, he sustained a torn meniscus in his knee but they finished 14th at the event and he then underwent surgery.

Navka/Morozov earned an Olympic berth by winning gold at the 1997 Karl Schäfer Memorial. 90 seconds into their free dance at the 1998 Winter Olympics, nearly three-quarters of the floodlights turned off but Navka/Morozov did not interrupt their performance. They finished 16th at the Olympics in Nagano, Japan, and 10th at the 1998 World Championships in Minneapolis. They were coached by Alexander Zhulin and Bob Young at the International Skating Center in Simsbury, Connecticut. When Navka decided to skate with another partner, Morozov tried skating with another woman for three months but then decided to retire.

Coaching and choreography career 
After his competitive retirement, Morozov became a coaching assistant for Tatiana Tarasova, with whom he choreographed for Alexei Yagudin, Barbara Fusar-Poli / Maurizio Margaglio, and Isabelle Delobel / Olivier Schoenfelder. In 2002 or 2003, he left Tarasova and began coaching and choreographing on his own. Morozov initially coached in Newington, Connecticut and later at the Ice House in Hackensack, New Jersey (United States). He returned to Moscow after the Russian government asked him to help in the preparation for the 2014 Sochi Olympics. He was based mainly at the Novogorsk national training center near Moscow and spent some time in New Jersey during summers.

His current and former students include: 

Ladies' single skaters
Miki Ando Coached her to win the 2007 and 2011 World Championships. He also served as her choreographer.
Shizuka Arakawa Coached her to win the Olympic gold medal in 2006.
Elene Gedevanishvili
Jelena Glebova
Alena Leonova
Valentina Marchei
Fumie Suguri

Men's single skaters
Daisuke Takahashi Coached him to win the silver medal at the 2007 World Championships. They split in May 2008 and then resumed working together in June 2012.
Denis Ten Coached since 2016.
Florent Amodio Coached him to win the 2011 European Championships.
Sergei Voronov
Artur Dmitriev, Jr.
Javier Fernández Coached until mid-2011. He was also the choreographer.
Maxim Kovtun Coached until mid-2012. He was also his choreographer
Austin Kanallakan
Nobunari Oda
Daisuke Murakami
Kevin van der Perren
Adam Rippon
Michael Christian Martinez
Ice dancers
Kaitlyn Weaver / Andrew Poje Coached since 2016.
Elena Ilinykh / Nikita Katsalapov Coach from mid-2011 to Olympic bronze medal in 2014.
Ekaterina Pushkash / Jonathan Guerreiro Coach since 2012
Shae-Lynn Bourne / Victor Kraatz. Coached them to win the 2003 World Championships.
Anna Cappellini / Luca Lanotte Coach from 2011 until mid-2012.
Kristin Fraser / Igor Lukanin
Melissa Gregory / Denis Petukhov
Elena Grushina / Ruslan Goncharov Coached them to an Olympic bronze medal in 2006.
Nóra Hoffmann / Attila Elek.
Svetlana Kulikova / Arseni Markov
Emilie Nussear / Mathew Gates
Cathy Reed / Chris Reed
Isabella Tobias / Otar Japaridze
Jennifer Wester / Daniil Barantsev
Anna Zadorozhniuk / Sergei Verbillo
Alexandra Zaretski / Roman Zaretski

Pair skaters
Tatiana Volosozhar / Stanislav Morozov
Ksenia Stolbova / Andrei Novoselov

As a choreographer 
His current and former choreography clients include
Sasha Cohen
Alisa Drei
Elene Gedevanishvili
Michelle Kwan
Yulia Lipnitskaya
Ann Patrice McDonough
Elena Muhhina
Alexia Paganini
Anna Pogorilaya
Elena Radionova
Sofia Samodurova 

Ivan Dinev
Takeshi Honda
Brian Joubert
Tamar Katz
Crystal Kiang
Michael Christian Martinez
Alban Préaubert
Daniel Samohin 
Scott Smith
Yosuke Takeuchi
Xu Ming
Alexei Yagudin

Julia Golovina / Oleg Voiko
Alexandra Kauc / Michał Zych
Pang Qing / Tong Jian
Tatiana Volosozhar / Maxim Trankov

Competitive highlights 
GP: Champions Series (Grand Prix)

With Pershankova for Azerbaijan

With Gvozdkova for Russia

With Navka for Belarus

Programs 
(with Navka)

References 

1975 births
Living people
Russian male ice dancers
Belarusian male ice dancers
Azerbaijani male ice dancers
Olympic figure skaters of Belarus
Figure skaters at the 1998 Winter Olympics
Russian figure skating coaches
Figure skating choreographers
Figure skaters from Moscow